landmark is Salyu's debut album. She previously released the album Kokyuu under the name Lily Chou-Chou.

Track listing
"landmark" 
"AI AMU" (アイアム; I Am)
"VALON-1" 
"Niji No Saki" (虹の先; End Of The Rainbow)
"Peaty" 
"Taion" (体温; Body Temperature)
"UEE" (ウエエ; Way)
"Dramatic Irony"
"Dialogue"
"Suisei" (彗星; Comet)
"Pop"

2005 albums
Salyu albums